Carlos Báez may refer to:

 Carlos Báez (athlete) (born 1948), Puerto Rican middle-distance runner
 Carlos Báez (footballer, born 1953), Paraguayan football forward
 Carlos Báez (footballer, born 1982), Paraguayan football defender